Lindomar Ferreira de Oliveira (born November 20, 1977) is a former Brazilian football player.

Club statistics

References

External links

1977 births
Living people
Brazilian footballers
Brazilian expatriate footballers
Expatriate footballers in Japan
J2 League players
Albirex Niigata players
Association football forwards